Clarence W. Dart, Sr. (6 December 1920 – 17 February 2012) was a World War II fighter pilot and member of the Tuskegee Airmen. During World War II. Dart was shot down twice earning two purple hearts. He was the recipient of the Distinguished Flying Cross award.

Career

He flew a total of 95 missions, and was shot down twice, earning two Purple Hearts. Dart died 17 February 2012 in Saratoga Springs, New York.

Clarence was Emeritus on The Salvation Army Saratoga Springs, New York Advisory Board in which he has served since November 11, 1963.

Awards
Air Medal
American Defense Service Medal
Congressional Gold Medal awarded to Tuskegee Airmen in 2006
Distinguished Flying Cross with four Oak Leaf Clusters, 
National Defense Service Medal
Purple Heart with one Oak Leaf Cluster
World War II Victory Medal

See also
 Dogfights (TV series)
 Executive Order 9981
 List of Tuskegee Airmen
 Military history of African Americans
 The Tuskegee Airmen (movie)

References

Notes

External links
 Fly (2009 play about the 332d Fighter Group)
 Lt. Col Clarence Dart NY Senate Veterans' Hall of Fame profile
 Tuskegee Airmen at Tuskegee University
 Tuskegee Airmen, Inc.
 Tuskegee Airmen National Historic Site (U.S. National Park Service) 
 Tuskegee Airmen National Museum

1920 births
2012 deaths
Congressional Gold Medal recipients
People from Elmira, New York
People from Saratoga Springs, New York
Recipients of the Air Medal
Recipients of the Distinguished Flying Cross (United States)
Tuskegee Airmen
United States Air Force officers
United States Army Air Forces officers
Burials at Greenridge Cemetery
African-American aviators
Aviators from New York (state)
21st-century African-American people